The non-marine mollusks of Malaysia are a part of the molluscan wildlife of Malaysia. A number of species of non-marine mollusks are found in the wild in Malaysia.

Freshwater gastropods 

Ampullariidae
 Pila ampullacea (Linnaeus, 1758)
 Pila scutata (Mousson, 1848)
 Pomacea canaliculata (Lamarck, 1819)

Nassariidae
 Clea bangueyensis EA Smith, 1895
 Clea nigricans A Adams, 1885

Neritidae
 Neritina pulligera (Linnaeus, 1767)
 Septaria porcellana (Linnaeus, 1858)
 Vittina coromandeliana (Sowerby, 1836)
 Vittina variegata (Lesson, 1831)

Pachychilidae
 Sulcospira pageli (Thiele, 1908)

Viviparidae
 Sinotaia guangdungensis (Kobelt, 1906)

Paludomidae
 Paludomus everetti EA Smith, 1894
 Paludomus luteus Adams, 1874

Physidae
 Physella acuta (Draparnaud, 1805)

Planorbidae
 Indoplanorbis exustus (Deshayes, 1834)

Thiaridae
 Mieniplotia scabra (OF Müller, 1774)
 Melanoides tuberculata (OF Müller, 1774)
 Tarebia granifera (Lamarck, 1822)

Land gastropods 

Assimineidae
 Acmella bauensis Marzuki, Liew & Mohd-Azlan, 2021
 Acmella cyrtoglyphe Vermeulen, Liew & Schilthuizen, 2015
 Acmella umbilicata Vermeulen, Liew & Schilthuizen, 2015
 Acmella ovoidea Vermeulen, Liew & Schilthuizen, 2015
 Acmella nana Vermeulen, Liew & Schilthuizen, 2015
 Acmella paeninsularis Foon & Marzuki, 2022
 Acmella subcancellata Vermeulen, Liew & Schilthuizen, 2015
 Acmella striata Vermeulen, Liew & Schilthuizen, 2015
 Anaglyphula sauroderma Vermeulen, Liew & Schilthuizen, 2015
 Solenomphala scalaris (Heude, 1882)

Cyclophoridae
 Craspedotropis borneensis (Godwin-Austen, 1889)
 Cyclophorus aquilus (Sowerby, 1843)
 Cyclophorus aurantiacus pernobilis Gould, 1844
 Cyclophorus cantori (Benson, 1851)
 Cyclophorus expansus (Pfeiffer, 1853)
 Cyclophorus malayanus (Benson, 1852)
 Cyclophorus perdix borneensis (Metcalfe, 1851)
 Cyclophorus pfeifferi Reeve, 1861
 Cyclophorus volvulus (O.F. Müller, 1774)
 Ditropopsis davisoni Vermeulen, Liew & Schilthuizen, 2015
 Ditropopsis everetti (E. A. Smith, 1895)
 Ditropopsis trachychilus Vermeulen, Liew & Schilthuizen, 2015
 Ditropopsis constricta Vermeulen, Liew & Schilthuizen, 2015
 Ditropopsis tyloacron Vermeulen, Liew & Schilthuizen, 2015
 Ditropopsis cincta Vermeulen, Liew & Schilthuizen, 2015
 Japonia anceps Vermeulen, Liew & Schilthuizen, 2015
 Japonia barbata (L. Pfeiffer, 1855)
 Japonia bauensis Marzuki, Liew & Mohd-Azlan, 2021
 Japonia metcalfei (Issel, 1874)
 Japonia mundyana (Godwin-Austen, 1889)
 Japonia rabongensis (E. A. Smith, 1895)
 Leptopoma sericatum (L. Pfeiffer, 1851)
 Leptopoma undatum (Metcalfe, 1851)
 Opisthoporus biciliatus (Mousson, 1849)
 Opisthoporus birostris (L. Pfeiffer, 1854)
 Opisthoporus cavernae (Godwin-Austen, 1889)
 Opisthoporus euryomphalus (L. Pfeiffer, 1856)
 Platyrhaphe linita (Godwin-Austen, 1889)
 Pterocyclos tenuilabiatus (Metcalfe, 1851)
 Scabrina belang Foon & Marzuki, 2022

Diplommatinidae
 Arinia linnei Maassen, 2008
 Arinia micro Marzuki & Foon, 2016
 Diplommatina adversa (H. Adams & A. Adams, 1851)
 Diplommatina azlani Marzuki, 2019
 Diplommatina bidentata Vermeulen, Liew & Schilthuizen, 2015
 Diplommatina busanensis Godwin-Austen, 1889
 Diplommatina concinna H. Adams, 1872
 Diplommatina heteropleura Vermeulen & Khalik, 2021
 Diplommatina isseli Godwin-Austen, 1889
 Diplommatina laidlawi Sykes, 1903
 Diplommatina maduana maduana Laidlaw, 1949
 Diplommatina moluensis E. A. Smith, 1893
 Diplommatina onyx Fulton, 1901
 Diplommatina spinosa Godwin-Austen, 1889
 Diplommatina toretos Vermeulen, 1993
 Diplommatina tweediei Laidlaw, 1949
 Diplommatina tylocheilos Vermeulen, Liew & Schilthuizen, 2015
 Opisthostoma ballorum Vermeulen, 1991
 Opisthostoma brachyacrum brachyacrum Thompson, 1978
 Opisthostoma brachyacrum lambi (Vermeulen, 1991)
 Opisthostoma cryptodon Vermeulen, 1991
 Opisthostoma planiapex Vermeulen, 1991
 Opisthostoma simile Vermeulen, 1994
 Opisthostoma tridens Vermeulen, 1991
 Plectostoma austeni (E. A. Smith, 1894)
 Plectostoma everetti (E. A. Smith, 1893)
 Plectostoma margaretchanae Marzuki, Liew & Mohd-Azlan, 2021
 Plectostoma wallacei busauense (E. A. Smith, 1893)
 Plectostoma wallacei teinostoma (Vermeulen, 1994)
 Plectostoma wallacei wallacei Ancey, 1887

Pupinidae
 Pupina doriae Godwin-Austen, 1889
 Pupina evansi Godwin-Austen, 1889
 Pupina hosei Godwin-Austen, 1889
 Rhaphaulus bombycinus (L. Pfeiffer, 1855)
 Rhaphaulus pfeifferi Issel, 1874

Hydrocenidae
 Georissa anyiensis Khalik, Hendriks, Vermeulen & Schilthuizen, 2018
 Georissa bauensis Khalik, Hendriks, Vermeulen & Schilthuizen, 2018
 Georissa everetti E. A. Smith, 1895
 Georissa hadra Thompson & Dance, 1983
 Georissa hosei Godwin-Austen, 1889
 Georissa hungerfordi Godwin-Austen, 1889
 Georissa kinabatanganensis Khalik, Hendriks, Vermeulen & Schilthuizen, 2018
 Georissa kobelti Gredler, 1902
 Georissa leucococca Vermeulen, Liew & Schilthuizen, 2015
 Georissa muluensis Khalik, Hendriks, Vermeulen & Schilthuizen, 2018
 Georissa nephrostoma Vermeulen, Liew & Schilthuizen, 2015
 Georissa niahensis Godwin-Austen, 1889
 Georissa pyrrhoderma Thompson & Dance, 1983
 Georissa saulae (van Benthem-Jutting, 1966)
 Georissa scalinella (van Benthem-Jutting, 1966)
 Georissa sepulutensis Khalik, Hendriks, Vermeulen & Schilthuizen, 2018
 Georissa silaburensis Khalik, Hendriks, Vermeulen & Schilthuizen, 2018

Camaenidae
 Amphidromus angulatus Fulton, 1896
 Amphidromus psephos Vermeulen, Liew & Schilthuizen, 2015
 Amphidromus cf. similis Pilsbry, 1900
 Bradybaena similaris (Férussac, 1822)
 Chloritis tomentosa (L. Pfeiffer, 1854)
 Kenyirus balingensis Tan, Chan & Foon, 2017
 Kenyirus sheema Foon, Tan & Clements, 2015
 Kenyirus sodhii Clements & Tan, 2012
 Landouria winteriana (L. Pfeiffer, 1842)
 Ganesella acris (Benson, 1859)
 Trachia serpentinitica Vermeulen, Liew & Schilthuizen, 2015

Chronidae
 Kaliella barrakporensis (L. Pfeiffer, 1852)
 Kaliella busauensis (E. A. Smith, 1895)
 Kaliella calculosa (Gould, 1852)
 Kaliella doliolum (L. Pfeiffer, 1846)
 Kaliella microconus (Mousson, 1865)
 Kaliella micula (Mousson, 1857)
 Kaliella platyconus Möllendorff, 1897
 Kaliella scandens (Cox, 1871)
 Platymma tweediei (Tomlin, 1938)

Endodontidae
 Beilania philippinensis (C. Semper, 1874)
 Philalanka jambusanensis Marzuki, Liew & Mohd-Azlan, 2021
 Philalanka kusana (Aldrich, 1889)
 Philalanka moluensis (E. A. Smith, 1893)
 Philalanka tambunanensis Vermeulen, Liew & Schilthuizen, 2015
 Philalanka obscura Vermeulen, Liew & Schilthuizen, 2015
 Philalanka anomphala Vermeulen, Liew & Schilthuizen, 2015
 Philalanka rugulosa Vermeulen, Liew & Schilthuizen, 2015
 Philalanka malimgunung Vermeulen, Liew & Schilthuizen, 2015

Euconulidae
 Kaliella eurytrochus Vermeulen, Liew & Schilthuizen, 2015
 Kaliella sublaxa Vermeulen, Liew & Schilthuizen, 2015
 Kaliella phacomorpha Vermeulen, Liew & Schilthuizen, 2015
 Kaliella punctata Vermeulen, Liew & Schilthuizen, 2015
 Kaliella microsoma Vermeulen, Liew & Schilthuizen, 2015
 Rahula delopleura Vermeulen, Liew & Schilthuizen, 2015

Punctidae
 Paralaoma angusta Vermeulen, Liew & Schilthuizen, 2015
 Paralaoma sarawakensis Marzuki, Liew & Mohd-Azlan, 2021

Charopidae
 Charopa sp. ‘argos’

Trochomorphidae
 Trochomorpha trachus Vermeulen, Liew & Schilthuizen, 2015
 Trochomorpha haptoderma Vermeulen, Liew & Schilthuizen, 2015
 Trochomorpha thelecoryphe Vermeulen, Liew & Schilthuizen, 2015
 Geotrochus conicoides (Metcalfe, 1851)
 Geotrochus oedobasis Vermeulen, Liew & Schilthuizen, 2015
 Geotrochus spilokeiria Vermeulen, Liew & Schilthuizen, 2015
 Geotrochus scolops Vermeulen, Liew & Schilthuizen, 2015
 Geotrochus kitteli Vermeulen, Liew & Schilthuizen, 2015
 Geotrochus subscalaris Vermeulen, Liew & Schilthuizen, 2015
 Geotrochus meristorhachis Vermeulen, Liew & Schilthuizen, 2015
 Videna bicolor (Martens, 1864)
 Videna timorensis (Martens, 1867)

Ryssotidae
 Exrhysota brookei (A. Adams & Reeve, 1848)

Helicarionidae
 Microcystis dyakana Godwin-Austen, 1891

Euconulidae
 Rahula raricostulata (E. A. Smith, 1893)

Clausiliidae
 Phaedusa borneensis (L. Pfeiffer, 1854)

Valloniidae
 Ptychopatula dioscoricola (C. B. Adams, 1845)
 Ptychopatula orcella (Stoliczka, 1873)
 Pupisoma moleculina (Van Benthem-Jutting, 1940)
 Pupisoma pulvisculum (Issel, 1874)

Veronicellidae
 Laevicaulis alte (Férussac, 1821)
 Semperula wallacei (Issel, 1874)
 Valiguna flava (Heynemann, 1885)

Rathouisiidae
 Atopos punctata Collinge 1902

Ariophantidae
 Damayantia carinata Collinge, 1901
 Durgella densestriata Vermeulen, Liew & Schilthuizen, 2015
 Dyakia chlorosoma Vermeulen, Liew & Schilthuizen, 2015
 Hemiplecta densa (A. Adams & Reeve, 1850)
 Macrochlamys infans (L. Pfeiffer, 1854)
 Macrochlamys sainctjohni (Godwin-Austen, 1891)
 Macrochlamys tersa (Issel, 1874)
 Microcystina arabii Marzuki, Liew & Mohd-Azlan, 2021
 Microcystina atoni Marzuki, Liew & Mohd-Azlan, 2021
 Microcystina kilat Marzuki, Liew & Mohd-Azlan, 2021
 Microcystina lirata Marzuki, Liew & Mohd-Azlan, 2021
 Microcystina oswaldbrakeni Marzuki, Liew & Mohd-Azlan, 2021
 Microcystina paripari Marzuki, Liew & Mohd-Azlan, 2021
 Microcystina microrhynchus Vermeulen, Liew & Schilthuizen, 2015
 Microcystina callifera Vermeulen, Liew & Schilthuizen, 2015
 Microcystina striatula Vermeulen, Liew & Schilthuizen, 2015
 Microcystina planiuscula Vermeulen, Liew & Schilthuizen, 2015
 Microcystina physotrochus Vermeulen, Liew & Schilthuizen, 2015
 Microcystina seclusa Godwin-Austen, 1891
 Ibycus rachelae Schilthuizen & Liew, 2008
 Microparmarion pollonerai Collinge & Godwin Austen, 1895
 Microparmarion simrothi Collinge & Godwin Austen, 1895
 Parmarion martensi Simroth, 1893
 Philippinella moellendorffi (Collinge, 1899)
 Vitrinula glutinosa (Metcalfe, 1851)

Limacidae
 Deroceras laeve (Müller, 1774)

Philomycidae
 Meghimatium striatum (Van Hasselt, 1824)
 Meghimatium uniforme Laidlaw 1937
 Meghimatium pictum (Stoliczka, 1872)

Subulinidae
 Allopeas myrmekophilos Janssen & Witte, 2002
 Curvella hadrotes Vermeulen, Liew & Schilthuizen, 2015

Alycaeidae
 Alycaeus alticola Foon & Liew, 2017
 Alycaeus altispirus Möllendorff, 1902
 Alycaeus balingensis Tomlin, 1948
 Alycaeus carinata Maassen, 2006
 Alycaeus charasensis Foon & Liew, 2017
 Alycaeus clementsi Foon & Liew, 2017
 Alycaeus conformis Fulton, 1902
 Alycaeus costacrassa Foon & Liew, 2017
 Alycaeus expansus Foon & Liew, 2017
 Alycaeus gibbosulus Stoliczka, 1872
 Alycaeus ikanensis Foon & Liew, 2017
 Alycaeus jousseaumei Morgan, 1885
 Alycaeus kapayanensis Morgan, 1885
 Alycaeus kelantanensis Sykes, 1902
 Alycaeus kurauensis Foon & Liew, 2017
 Alycaeus liratulus Preston, 1907
 Alycaeus perakensis Crosse, 1879
 Alycaeus regalis Foon & Liew, 2017
 Alycaeus robeleni Möllendorff, 1894
 Alycaeus selangoriensis Foon & Liew, 2017
 Alycaeus senyumensis Foon & Liew, 2017
 Alycaeus thieroti Morgan, 1885
 Alycaeus virgogravida Foon & Liew, 2017
 Chamalycaeus specus (Godwin-Austen, 1889)
 Pincerna globosa (H. Adams, 1870)
 Stomacosmethis hosei (Godwin-Austen, 1889)
 Stomacosmethis sadongensis (E. A. Smith, 1895)

Vertiginidae
 Boysidia salpinx F. G. Thompson & Dance, 1983
 Hypselostoma megaphonum van Benthem-Jutting, 1950
 Hypselostoma perigyra van Benthem-Jutting, 1950
 Paraboysidia serpa van Benthem-Jutting, 1950

Dyakiidae
 Dyakia busanensis Godwin-Austen, 1891
 Dyakia subdebilis E. A. Smith, 1895
 Everettia cutteri (H. Adams, 1870)
 Everettia microrhytida Marzuki, Liew & Mohd-Azlan, 2021
 Everettia minuta Marzuki, Liew & Mohd-Azlan, 2021
 Rhinocochlis nasuta (Metcalfe, 1851)
 Quantula striata (Gray, 1834)

Achatinellidae
 Elasmias sundanum (Möllendorff, 1897)

Achatinidae
 Lissachatina fulica (Bowdich, 1822)
 Allopeas clavulinum (Potiez & Michaud, 1838)
 Allopeas gracile (T. Hutton, 1834)
 Opeas didyma (Westerlund, 1883)
 Paropeas achatinaceum (L. Pfeiffer, 1846)

Diapheridae
 Platycochlium sarawakense Laidlaw, 1950
 Sinoennea Kobelt, 1904

Streptaxidae
 Gulella bicolor (T. Hutton, 1834)
 Odontartemon balingensis Tomlin, 1948

Succineidae
 Succinea obesa (Martens, 1867)

See also
 List of marine molluscs of Malaysia

Lists of molluscs of surrounding countries:
 List of non-marine molluscs of Thailand
 List of non-marine molluscs of Indonesia
 List of non-marine molluscs of Brunei
 List of non-marine molluscs of Singapore
 List of non-marine molluscs of Vietnam
 List of non-marine molluscs of the Philippines

References

External links 
 The Terrestrial Gastropods of Sabah (North Borneo), Malaysia
 Issel A. (1874). Molluschi Borneensi. Genova, Tipografia del R. Instituto Sordo-Muti.

Molluscs
Malaysia
Malaysia